Melanolophia signataria, the signate melanolophia, is a moth of the  family Geometridae. It is found from Nova Scotia to Florida, west to Saskatchewan and East Texas.

The wingspan is 30–35 mm. Adults are on wing from March to August.

The larvae feed on the leaves of a wide variety of trees, including alder, elm, birch, fir, larch, maple, oak, poplar and spruce.

Subspecies
Melanolophia signataria signataria
Melanolophia signataria timucuae (Florida)

External links
Bug Guide
Images

Melanolophiini